Francesco Miele (27 January 1938 – 22 July 2001) was an Italian racing cyclist. He rode in the 1962 Tour de France.

References

1938 births
2001 deaths
Italian male cyclists
Place of birth missing